FC SKD Samara was a Russian football team from Samara. It played professionally in 1989 and from 1993 to 1995. Their best result was 8th place in Zone 6 of the Russian Second Division in 1993.

Team name history
 1993–1995: FC SKD Samara

External links
  Team history at KLISF

Association football clubs established in 1989
Association football clubs disestablished in 1996
Defunct football clubs in Russia
Sport in Samara, Russia
1989 establishments in Russia
1996 disestablishments in Russia